Thames was launched in 1807 in Howden. She first sailed as a West Indiaman, and later traded with Brazil. Privateers captured her twice. The first time the British Royal Navy was able swiftly to recapture her. The second time Thamess American captor sent her into Portland, Maine after a single ship action.

Career
Although Thames was launched at Howdon in 1807, she did not appear in the Register of Shipping or Lloyd's Register (LR) until 1809.

Captain Jame Grieve acquired a letter of marque on 18 May 1809.

In January 1810 Lloyd's List reported that  had recaptured Thames, Greeve, master and sent her into Fowey. Thames had been returning to Liverpool from  when a French privateer had captured her.

Fate
Thames was scheduled to leave Maranham on 30 April 1813 for Liverpool, in company with Paris, Harrison, master, and Watson, Grieg, master. The privateer Yankee captured Thames off Ireland; later, Thames was reported to have arrived in Portland, Maine on 1 July.

Another account has Yankee, Captain Elisha Snow, capturing Thames on 30 May after an action of one hour. Thames had 14 guns, but only 20 men. On 3 June, Yankee stopped a Portuguese brig from New York. Snow put Thamess captain and crew aboard the brig after they had promised not to fight against the United states again.

Yankee was on her third cruise. Thames was carrying 287 bales of cotton, and vessel and cargo sold for $110,000. Each share in her voyage received $173.54.

On this cruise Yankee captured more than six vessels belonging to Liverpool, as well as a number of others. She might have captured more, but on 8 October, she only captured Paris, Harrison, master, of six gun and 11 men, after a single ship action that left both damaged, forcing Yankee to have to go into port to repair.  later recaptured Paris.

Citations

References
 
 
 

1807 ships
Age of Sail merchant ships of England
Captured ships